Glenelg Football Club is an Australian rules football team, which plays in the South Australian National Football League. The club is known as the "Tigers" (or the "Bays"), and their home ground is ACH Group Stadium (formerly Glenelg Oval), located in the southern coastal suburb of Glenelg East, South Australia.

Club history
The inaugural meeting of the Glenelg Football Club was held at the Glenelg Town Hall on Wednesday 10 March 1920, to form a club for players west of South Road to play in the B Grade. It was decided that the club colors would be red, yellow and black with white knickers.

The Club participated in the B Grade (Reserves) Competition in 1920  and entered the South Australian League in 1921. At the Annual meeting on Thursday 3 March 1921 the club decided its colours to be black and gold, the guernsey to be black with a gold hoop around waist and arms, black socks with gold band, and white knickers. It was not until 2 May 1925 that the club saw its first league victory, a 12.6 (78) to 10.10 (70) win over West Torrens at Glenelg Oval.

"The Bays", as they are sometimes known (due to the club's proximity to Holdfast Bay), won their first SANFL premiership in 1934 with an 18.15 (123) to 16.18 (114) victory against . The 1935 season saw them slump from first to last.

Until 1948, the team jersey was gold with a black V, in 1949 the club adopted the now familiar black with gold sash design. Since 2021 the team has revived the pre-1949 jersey and wears it as its "away" strip.

In total the club has won 5 premierships – in 1934, 1973, back to back flags in 1985 and 1986 and most recently in 2019 – breaking a 33 year premiership drought against traditional rivals .

Glenelg amalgamated with West Adelaide Football Club during the war years 1942 to 1944.

Glenelg were a foundation member of the SANFL Women's competition in 2017.

Home grounds
Glenelg Oval (ACH Group Stadium) (1921–90, 1992–present)
Football Park (1991)

Since the club first entered the SANFL they have used Glenelg Oval as their home ground. The only year this did not occur was in 1991 when Glenelg used Football Park (along with new team Woodville-West Torrens) under the SANFL's ground rationalisation scheme. This arrangement only lasted for the 1991 season as Glenelg moved back to The Bay while the Eagles moved to Woodville Oval.

In 2012 Glenelg Oval became one of five suburban SANFL grounds to have lights installed for night games.

The ground record crowd for Glenelg Oval was set on 20 July 1968 when 17,171 saw Sturt defeat Glenelg by just one point, 13.13 (91) to 13.12 (90). The record night attendance was set on 25 April 2014 (ANZAC Day) when 9,245 saw Glenelg defeat the Adelaide Crows reserves 17.21 (123) to 13.8 (86) for the Tigers first win of the 2014 SANFL season.

Glenelg Oval also saw the highest score in SANFL history in 1975 when Glenelg defeated Central District 49.23 (317) to 11.13 (79): the winning margin of 238 is the 2017 the SANFL record, and remains the club's record win. Glenelg's champion full-forward, the 1969 Magarey Medallist Fred Phillis, kicked 18 goals for the game, including his 100th for the season.

Club song
The Glenelg Tigers have the same club song as that of the Richmond Tigers based on "Row, Row, Row".

Oh we're from Tigerland
A fighting fury, we're from Tigerland
In any weather you'll see us with a grin
Risking head and shin
If we're behind then never mind
We'll fight and fight and win
For we're from Tigerland.
We never weaken till the final siren's gone
Like the Tiger of old, we're strong and we're bold
For we're from Tiger – black and the gold – we're from Tigerland.

Current playing list

(c)

 

 

(vc)

Coach = Brett Hand
Assistant Coach = Brett Exelby
Reserves Coach = Joel Tucker

Club achievements

Club records
South Australian Supplementary Premiership Winners: 2 – 1971, 2007
Home Ground: Glenelg Oval (Gliderol Stadium @ Glenelg) (1921–90, 1992–Current)
Previous Grounds: Football Park (1991)
Record Attendance at Gliderol Stadium @ Glenelg: 17,171 v Sturt on 20 July 1968
Record Attendance at Gliderol Stadium @ Glenelg since Adelaide Football Club formation (1991): 11,827 v Sturt, 28 June 2008
Record Night Attendance at Gliderol Stadium @ Glenelg: 9,245 v Adelaide, 25 April 2014
Record Attendance: 58,113 v Sturt at Football Park, 1974 SANFL Grand Final
Record Attendance since Adelaide Crows formation (1991): 42,242 v  at AAMI Stadium, 1992 SANFL Grand Final
Record Attendance since  AFL entry (1997): 39,105 v , 2019 SANFL Grand Final
Most Games: 423 by Peter Carey (1971–88) 
Most Goals: 842 by D.K. "Fred" Phillis (1966–78, 1981)
Most Goals in Match: 18 by D.K. "Fred" Phillis v Central District in 1975
Most Goals in a Season: 137 by D.K. "Fred" Phillis in 1969
First player to kick 100 goals in an SANFL season: Jack Owens (1932 – 102 goals)
Most Years as Coach: 10 by Neil Kerley (1967–76)
Most Years as Captain: 8 by Nick Chigwidden (1993–2000)
Highest Score: 49.23 (317) v Central District 11.13 (79) at Glenelg Oval in Round 17, 23 August 1975
Lowest Score: 1.4 (10) v Norwood in 2004
Greatest Win: 238 points v Central District in 1975
Greatest Loss: 146 points v North Adelaide in 1936
Longest Winning Run: 18 in 1973–1974
Longest Losing Run: 56 in 1921–1925

Post World War 2 coaches

 Ray Curnow (1945)
 Norm Betson (1946)
 Ray Curnow (1947–1948)
 Allan Reval (1949)
 Johnny Taylor (1950–1952)
 Pat Hall (1953–1954)
 Charlie May (1955–1957)
 Neil Davies (1958–1959)
 Marcus Boyall (1960)
 Stan Wickham (1961)
 Doug Long (1962–1963)
 Len Fitzgerald (1964–1966)
 Neil Kerley (1967–1976)
 John Nicholls (1977–1978)
 John Halbert (1979–1982)
 Graham Campbell (1983–1984)
 Graham Cornes (1985–1990)
 Kym Hodgeman (1991–1992)
 Mark Williams (1993–1994)
 Tony Symonds (1995–1996)
 Wayne Stringer (1997)
 Tony McGuinness (1998–2000)
 Brenton Honor (2001–2002)
 David Noble (2003–2004)
 Peter Simmons (2005)
 Tony Burgess (2005)
 Mark Mickan (2006–2011)
 Kris Massie (2011–2013)
 Nick Stevens (2014)
 Matthew Lokan (2015–2017)
 Mark Stone (2018–2020)
 Brett Hand (2021–)

Post World War 2 placings

1945 – 7th
1946 – 8th
1947 – 7th
1948 – 6th
1949 – 5th
1950 – 2nd
1951 – 3rd
1952 – 5th
1953 – 3rd
1954 – 8th
1955 – 6th
1956 – 6th
1957 – 7th
1958 – 7th
1959 – 3rd
1960 – 8th
1961 – 7th
1962 – 5th
1963 – 7th
1964 – 4th
1965 – 6th
1966 – 10th
1967 – 4th
1968 – 5th
1969 – 2nd
1970 – 2nd
1971 – 6th
1972 – 6th
1973 – 1st
1974 – 2nd
1975 – 2nd
1976 – 3rd
1977 – 2nd
1978 – 4th
1979 – 7th
1980 – 4th
1981 – 2nd
1982 – 2nd
1983 – 7th
1984 – 3rd
1985 – 1st
1986 – 1st
1987 – 2nd
1988 – 2nd
1989 – 5th
1990 – 2nd
1991 – 6th
1992 – 2nd
1993 – 4th
1994 – 5th
1995 – 7th
1996 – 7th
1997 – 8th
1998 – 9th
1999 – 4th
2000 – 9th
2001 – 9th
2002 – 9th
2003 – 8th
2004 – 7th
2005 – 8th
2006 – 6th
2007 – 4th
2008 – 2nd
2009 – 3rd
2010 – 4th
2011 – 5th
2012 – 6th
2013 – 9th
2014 – 10th
2015 – 9th
2016 – 7th
2017 – 7th
2018 – 6th
2019 – 1st
2020 - 4th
2021 - 2nd

Magarey Medallists
The Magarey Medal is awarded to the "fairest and most brilliant" player in the League during the Home and Away season. Glenelg has ten Magarey Medalists and two Reserves Magarey Medalists:
 1928 – Jim Handby
 1934 – George "Blue" Johnston
 1940 – Mel Brock
 1941 – Marcus Boyall
 1949 – Allan Crabb
 1969 – D.K. "Fred" Phillis
 1974 – Kym Hodgeman (Reserves Magarey Medalist)
 1978 – Kym Hodgeman
 1982 – Tony McGuinness
 2006 – Brett Backwell
 2008 – Scott Lewis (Reserves Magarey Medalist)
 2019 – Luke Partington

SANFL leading goalkickers
 1927 – Jack Owens (80 goals)
 1928 – Jack Owens (83)
 1932 – Jack Owens (102)
 1948 – Colin Churchett (88)
 1949 – Colin Churchett (72)
 1950 – Colin Churchett (105)
 1951 – Colin Churchett (102)
 1969 – D.K. "Fred" Phillis (137)
 1970 – D.K. "Fred" Phillis (107)
 1971 – D.K. "Fred" Phillis (99)
 1975 – D.K. "Fred" Phillis (108)
 1976 – D.K. "Fred" Phillis (98)

Ken Farmer Medallists
 2010 - Todd Grima (58)
 2015 - Clint Alleway (47)
 2019 - Liam McBean (46)
 2020 - Liam McBean (38)
 2021 - Liam McBean (51)

Fos Williams Medalists
The Fos Williams Medal is awarded to the best player during State of Origin games for South Australia. Glenelg has six Fos Williams Medalists, including one dual medalist:
 1981 – Peter Carey
 1982 – Stephen Copping
 1982 – Paul Weston
 1984 – Stephen Kernahan
 1987 – Chris McDermott
 1988 – Stephen Kernahan
 2003 – Brett Backwell

Jack Oatey Medalists
The Jack Oatey Medal is awarded to the best player during Grand Final. Glenelg has three Jack Oatey Medalists:
 1985 – Stephen Kernahan
 1986 – Tony Hall
 2019 – Matthew Snook

Glenelg Hall of Fame
The Glenelg Football Club set up its Hall of Fame in 2001, when it inducted 25 of its greatest players. There have since been 14 induction ceremonies, the most recent taking place in 2021, as the club marked its League centenary celebrations. Glenelg's Hall of Fame divides players into five main historical eras for the club: 1) 1921–1939; 2) 1940–1960; 3) 1961–1976; 4) 1977–1990; and 5) 1991–2021.

 Players with names in bold are also in the South Australian Football Hall of Fame
 Players with an asterisk* next to their names are also in the Australian Football Hall of Fame

Club ambassadors
As of 2013 the Glenelg Football Club has seven club ambassadors. They are:

 Anna Meares – Multiple World and Olympic track cycling champion.
 Brett Aitken – Olympic track cyclist. 2000 Olympic Gold Medallist – Men's Madison
 Gary Sweet – Film and television actor
 Jane Woodlands-Thompson – Head coach of the ANZ Championship's Adelaide Thunderbirds netball team
 John Hawkes – Leading Australian horse trainer
 Kate Ellis – Federal Member for Adelaide. Current Shadow Minister for Education and Early Childhood.
 Luke Schenscher – 7'1" (216 cm) tall former NBA basketball player. Formerly played for the Adelaide 36ers in the Australasian-based National Basketball League.

References

External links

 
 Snouts Louts, Glenelg Football Club supporter group site
 
 

South Australian National Football League clubs
SANFL Women's League
Australian rules football clubs in South Australia
1920 establishments in Australia